The 22619 / 22620 Tirunelveli–Bilaspur Superfast Express  is a Express express train belonging to Indian Railways Southern Railway zone that runs between  and  in India.

It operates as train number 22620 from Tirunelveli Junction to Bilaspur Junction and as train number 22619 in the reverse direction, serving the states of Kerala, Tamil Nadu, Andhra Pradesh, Telangana, Maharashtra & Chhattisgarh.

Coaches
The 22620 / 19 Tirunelveli–Bilaspur  Express has one AC 2-tier, two AC 3-tier, 12 sleeper class, four general unreserved & two SLR (seating with luggage rake) coaches and two high capacity parcel van coaches. It does not carry a pantry car.

LHB rake is allotted for the service from 3 June 2018.

As is customary with most train services in India, coach composition may be amended at the discretion of Indian Railways depending on demand.

Service

Routing

Traction

As the route is fully electrified, a Royapuram Loco Shed / Erode Loco Shed-based WAP-7 (HOG)-equipped locomotive powers the train for its entire journey.

See also

Tirunelveli Junction
Bilaspur Junction

References

External links
22620 Tirunelveli Bilaspur Express at India Rail Info
22619 Bilaspur Tirunelveli Express at India Rail Info

Express trains in India
Transport in Tirunelveli
Rail transport in Kerala
Rail transport in Tamil Nadu
Rail transport in Andhra Pradesh
Rail transport in Telangana
Rail transport in Maharashtra
Rail transport in Chhattisgarh
Transport in Bilaspur, Chhattisgarh
2010 establishments in India